The men's marathon event at the 1934 British Empire Games was held on 7 August in London, England, with the start and finish at the White City Stadium.

Results

References

Athletics at the 1934 British Empire Games
1934